Marko Brkić may refer to:
 Marko Brkić (basketball)
 Marko Brkić (footballer)